Udaipur ( Pron:/uːˈdaɪpʊə or ˈuːdaɪˌpʊə/), formerly known as Rangamati, is the third biggest urban area in the Indian state of Tripura. The town was a capital of the state during the reign of the Manikya Dynasty. It is famous for the Tripura Sundari temple also known as Tripureswari temple, one of the 51 Shakti Peethas.It is a Municipal Council in Gomati district & also the headquarters of Gomati district. Udaipur is about 51 km from Agartala, the capital of Tripura.

Geography

It has an average elevation of 22 metres (72 feet).The Gomati river passes through the heart of Udaipur and helps in irrigation of its lands.

Demographics
As of 2011 India census, Udaipur nagar panchayat had a population of 32,758, of which 16,593 were males and 16,165 were females. The total number of literates in Udaipur were 28,378, of which 14,563 were males and 13,8155 were females. Udaipur has an effective literacy rate (for population 7 years and above) of 94.84%, of which male literacy is 96.50%, and female literacy is 93.15%. In Udaipur, 2,836 of the population is in the 0-6 age range. It had a 8530 households. And the number of Scheduled Castes and Scheduled Tribes in Udaipur were 6,323 and 363 respectively.

Attractions in Udaipur
Udaipur is dotted with temples the most famous of which is the Tripura Sundari temple, which is one of the 51 Shakti Peethas. The temple was constructed by Maharaja Dhanya Manikya Debbarma in 1501. There is a big lake beside the temple known as Kalyan Sagar. Bhubaneshwari Temple is another famous temple here. Gunabati temple, Jagannath temple, Mahadev Temple are other famous temples. Udaipur is also known as "lake city" and has many beautiful lakes. Some of them are Jagannath dighi, Mahadev Dighi, Amar sagar, Dhanisagar and as mentioned above, Kalyan sagar. It also has a national library named "Nazrul Granthagar", after Kazi Nazrul Islam. Tepania Eco Park and Puran Rajbari are other attractions of Udaipur. It is called the tourism capital of Tripura.

Education

General Degree Colleges
Netaji Subash Mahavidyalaya, erstwhile Udaipur Government Degree College is present at Dhajanagar beside NH 8.

Schools
 Vivekananda Vidyapith, higher secondary school.
 Jawahar Navodaya Vidyalaya, at Fulkumari has hostel facility for the students.

Transportation 

Udaipur railway station is situated near Matabari. The station lies on the Lumding–Sabroom section, which comes under the Lumding railway division of the Northeast Frontier Railway. It is one of India's most beautiful railway stations with mesmerising architecture. Udaipur lies on NH 8, Agartala to Sabroom segment. From Rajarbag Motor Stand all day road connectivity is available towards  capital Agartala and other cities of the states. The biggest river of the state Gomati is passing besides the town. To create a water connectivity through the river by increase the depth of the river is a part of one of the auspicious future  project of the central govt.

Image gallery

See also
 List of cities and towns in Tripura

References

External links

Cities and towns in Gomati district